Natalia Vadimovna Molchanova (8 May 1962 – 2 August 2015) was a Russian champion free diver, multiple world record holder, and the former president of the Russian Free Dive Federation. She has been described as "possibly the world’s greatest freediver".

Molchanova's son is Russian freediving champion Alexey Molchanov. 

On 2 August 2015 she vanished in Formentera while giving a private lesson. Search efforts were abandoned on 5 August and she was presumed dead.

Personal life
Molchanova was born in 1962 in Ufa, Bashkortostan, then part of the Soviet Union. Molchanova had a son Alexey and daughter Oksana.

Career
Molchanova was the world's most decorated free diver ever, holding 41 world records at the time of her presumed death and winning 23 gold medals during her lengthy career. At the 2007 Freediving World Championships in Maribor, Slovenia, her winning time in the static discipline was better than the winning male gold medal. In September 2009, she became the first woman to pass 100 meters (328 ft.) diving with constant weight, in a dive to 101 meters (331 ft.) in Sharm el Sheikh, Egypt. Molchanova was also the first woman to dive on one breath through the Blue Hole arch in Dahab, Egypt. Her record was a dive of 127 metres (417 ft.).

She first trained in swimming, but semi-retired for approximately 20 years after giving birth. She resumed training, aged 40, and shifted from swimming to free diving. Her first free diving competition was the 2003 Russian championships in Moscow, where she set a national record. Her son is also a prominent free diving competitor. Molchanova later worked as a free diving instructor at the Russian State University of Physical Education, Sport, Youth and Tourism.

Disappearance
On 2 August 2015, she was reported missing after giving a private lesson dive near Formentera, Spain. She went down to a depth of 40 metres (131 ft.), not as deep as normal; but, caught by a current, without weights, she is thought to have been taken down.  She never came up for air.  Initial rescue and recovery efforts were unsuccessful. As of 4 August, search and rescue efforts continued, but she was presumed dead by the search party, including her son Alexey Molchanov.

The Spanish Civil Code provides that a missing person by shipwreck or amid a dangerous activity shall be declared deceased in absentia three months after a missing report.

See also
List of people who disappeared mysteriously at sea

World records 

 Note 1: The two records from 2009, 101 m and 90 m, were repealed by the federation eight months after they had been set, due to the introduction of a new rule, which was then applied retroactively.
 Note 2: Freediving#Competitive apnea defines the various Apnea codes. Record distances are in metres; duration times in minutes and seconds.

Summary:
 STA - 9 min. 02 sec.
 DYN - 234 m
 DNF - 182 m
 CWT - 101 m
 CNF - 69 m
 FIM - 91 m
 VWT - 127 m

Clarification:
 STA = Static apnea. Holding the breath as long as possible.
 DYN = Dynamic apnea with fins. Diving as far as possible (horizontally) with the use of fins or a monofin.
 DNF = Dynamic apnea without fins. Diving as far as possible (horizontally) without fins.
 CWT = Constant weight with fins. Diving as deep as possible with the use of fins or a monofin.
 CNF = Constant weight without fins. Diving as deep as possible without fins.
 FIM = Free immersion. Diving as deep as possible by pulling down and up the rope.
 VWT = Variable weight apnea. Using a sled for descent, pulling back up along a line or swimming up with or without fins.
 NLT = No-limits apnea. Using a sled for descent, and an inflatable bag for ascent, or any other method or technique.

Personal bests

References

External links

  
 Current Freediving World Records at International Association for the Development of Freediving (AIDA)
  

1962 births
2010s missing person cases
2015 deaths
Missing people
Missing person cases in Spain
People declared dead in absentia
Sport deaths in Spain
Sportspeople from Ufa
Russian expatriate sportspeople in Spain
Russian freedivers
Underwater diving deaths